Cottles Bridge is a town in Victoria, Australia, 30 km north-east of Melbourne's Central Business District, located within the Shire of Nillumbik local government area. Cottles Bridge recorded a population of 609 at the 2021 census.

History

The area, previously known as Back Creek, was named after Thomas Cottle, who settled in the area in the 1870s. Cottle's Bridge Post Office opened on 1 January 1910 and closed in 1960.

The actual Cottles Bridge is located west of St. Andrews in a location that was once full of small farms and orchards

On 23 April 1942 it was reported that the Cottles Bridge Methodist Church had a fundraiser to erect a vestry for the church. The fundraising concert took place in the church and audience members were treated to a performance by the Diamond Creek Choir and the Cottles Bridge Choir. The church managed to raise four pounds that night, taking the total amount of the fundraising to twenty-one pounds. The church needed forty pounds to erect the vestry. Fundraising for the vestry took on many guises. For example, house parties were popular forms of fundraising. One such house party took place at Mrs Phipps house in 1941. Fifteen people attended and took part in an evening of games, competitions, and musical items. Mrs Phipps house party raised just under four pounds.

Did the Methodist church eventually raise their much needed funds for the vestry? Unfortunately there wasn't another newspaper article following this story up.

From the 1950s onwards, various artists settled in the area, most notably Clifton Pugh AO, who established the Dunmoochin Artists Society there in 1953.

Present day

Cottles Bridge is home to the Lovegrove Vineyard and Winery, an award-winning Yarra Valley winery which established in 1983 and produces sparkling wines, chardonnay, sauvignon blanc, pinot noir, cabernet and merlot. There is also the  Hurstbridge Learning Co-Operative Primary School, a parent-run, alternative school for primary school students established in 1973.

The area is not serviced by Melbourne public transport.

See also
 Shire of Eltham – Cottles Bridge was previously within this former local government area.

References

Wine regions of Victoria (Australia)
Shire of Nillumbik